Nadie me quita lo bailao also known as Zumba in the rest of the world, is a Colombian biographical telenovela that premiered on RCN Televisión on 7 May 2018 and concluded on 19 July 2018. The show is based on the life on the Colombian dancer Beto Pérez. It stars Julián Román as the title character.

Cast 
 Julián Román as Beto Pérez
 Alejandra Ávila as Sandra Izquierdo
 Silvia de Dios as Liliana Guzmán
 Luz Estrada as Gloria Pérez
 Fernando Solórzano as Don Carlos
 Wayra Schreiber as Sandra Guzmán
 Jo Pratta as Gloria Pérez
 Pedro Calvo as Ronni Ramírez
 Erik Joel Rodríguez as Juan Tróchez
 Omar Murillo as El Negro Mina
 María Emilia Kamper as Emma
 Jaider Villa as Luis Velandia
 Kepa Amuchastegui as Don Pedro
 Isabella Santiago as Mónica Tróchez
 Alejandra Taborda as Karina Asprilla
 María Claudia Torres as Leonor
 Libby Brien as Laura
 Amanda Peter as Lina Trochez
 Julieth Restrepo as Petra Cifuentes
 Arthur Garbe as Richard
 Philip Hersh as Don Carlos
 Carlos Manuel Vesga as Daniel
 Alejandro Palacio as Sandro
 Patricia Castañeda as Rebeca
 Mijail Mulkay as Camacho
 Shirly Gómez as Salomé

References 

Colombian telenovelas
Spanish-language telenovelas
2018 telenovelas
2018 Colombian television series debuts
2018 Colombian television series endings
RCN Televisión telenovelas
Television shows set in Cali